Taractrocera tilda is a butterfly of the family Hesperiidae. It is only known from the Chinese provinces of Sichuan and Yunnan.

External links
Phylogeny and biogeography of the genus Taractrocera Butler, 1870 (Lepidoptera: Hesperiidae), an example of Southeast Asian-Australian interchange

Taractrocerini
Endemic fauna of China
Butterflies described in 1934